Moore House, also known as Stamp's Quarter, is a historic home located near Locust Hill, Caswell County, North Carolina.  It was built about 1790, and is a two-story, three bay, Federal style brick dwelling.  It is set on a full, raised basement, has exterior end chimneys, and a low hipped roof.

It was added to the National Register of Historic Places in 1973.

References

External links

Historic American Buildings Survey in North Carolina
Houses on the National Register of Historic Places in North Carolina
Federal architecture in North Carolina
Houses completed in 1790
Houses in Caswell County, North Carolina
National Register of Historic Places in Caswell County, North Carolina